Peter Nobel (born 1931) is a Swedish human rights lawyer and a member of the Nobel family, who served as Sweden's first Ombudsman for discrimination (1986–1991), Secretary General of the Swedish Red Cross (1991–94), and an expert for the UN Committee on the Elimination of Racial Discrimination (1998–2001).
 
Peter Nobel is a descendant of the industrialist and humanitarian Ludvig Nobel, the founder of Branobel.

Like several other members of his family, among them Marta Helena Nobel-Oleinikoff, he is a fierce critic of the Nobel Memorial Prize in Economic Sciences, and what he and his family see as misuse of their family name by the awarding institution. He argues that no member of the Nobel family has ever had the intention of creating an award in economics.

Recognitions
Honorary doctorate in law, Uppsala University
Honorary member of Stockholms nation

Publications
Peter Nobel (2004). I idealisk riktning - Mitt liv. Atlantis

References

Peter
20th-century Swedish lawyers
Red Cross personnel
1931 births
Living people